Harry Clayton Stutz (September 12, 1876 in Ohio – June 26, 1930)  was an American automobile manufacturer, entrepreneur, self-taught engineer, and innovator in the automobile industry.

On finishing his schooling he moved to Dayton, Ohio, and after working for Davis Sewing Machine and National Cash Register opened a machine shop and repair business in 1897, the next year he married Clara Marie Dietz. Clara and Harry had one daughter.

Stutz grew up caring for and repairing agricultural machinery on the family farm. Automobiles and engines fascinated him. Stutz built his first car in 1897, and then in 1900 a second auto using a gasoline engine of his own design and manufacture. He set up Stutz Manufacturing Company to build these engines selling it in late 1902 to Lindsay Automobile Parts Company of Indianapolis and he moved there along with the business. With two others he established Central Motor Car Company but moved on to the Schebler Carburetor Company at the end of 1904 to sell their carburettors.

In 1905 he designed a car for the American Motor Car Company. He moved again in 1907 to take up the appointment of chief engineer and factory manager at Marion Motor Car Company. At Marion he became one of the company's racing drivers. He formed Stutz Auto Parts Company in 1910 to manufacture his transaxle. Becoming well-known for his activities he came to the attention of the founders of the Indianapolis racetrack and helped design their own car. Caught up in the excitement around the up-coming 500 mile race, the first at the new racetrack, within just five weeks he built his own car and entered it in the race. His car was placed 11th at the finish having stopped only for tires and fuel. He immediately set about putting his Bear Cat into production. To accomplish that Harry founded Ideal Motor Car Company renamed in June 1913 Stutz Motor Car Company (of Indiana).

Stutz Motor's racing program was very successful winning the (unofficial) national championships each year up to 1916 when they withdrew from competition. To find more capital for his prospering business he fell in with a New York stockbroker, Allan A Ryan, and in 1916 Stutz Motor Car Company of America was listed on the New York Stock Exchange. Ryan now controlled the business. Uncomfortable with Ryan's business style Harry Stutz resigned in the middle of 1919 and started again by founding his H. C. S. Motor Car Company. He also began making fire engines. The fire engine business fared better than his H. C. S. Motor Car Company. He divorced his wife in 1925 and married Blanche Clark Miller. Harry seemed to lose interest in both businesses and with his new wife he moved to Orlando, Florida. After 2 years under the control of creditors his businesses were liquidated. In 1929 he designed a 4-cylinder engine for the Stutz-Bellanca Airplane Company.

Harry Stutz suddenly collapsed and died of a ruptured appendix in Indianapolis in the summer of 1930. He is buried there at Crown Hill Cemetery.

References
 The Automotive Hall of Fame Inductee Page, retrieved on: August 26, 2006.

American automotive pioneers
American people of German descent
American founders of automobile manufacturers
1876 births
1930 deaths
Burials at Crown Hill Cemetery
Businesspeople from Indianapolis